"You Look Like I Need a Drink" is a song written by Rodney Clawson, Matt Dragstrem and Natalie Hemby and recorded by American country music artist Justin Moore. It was released in November 2015 as the first single to Moore's 2016 album Kinda Don't Care.  The single topped the Country Airplay and Canada Country charts, and peaked at number 12 on the Hot Country Songs chart.

Commercial performance
The song debuted at No. 41 on Country Airplay after its premiere on iHeartMedia stations on October 30, 2015 before its official add date of November 17.  It also debuted at No. 34 on Hot Country Songs and No. 14 on Country Digital Songs, with 20,000 copies sold in its first week. The song has sold 165,000 copies in the US as of August 2016. For the week of October 8, 2016, it became Moore's fifth number one country single. The following week, it disappeared from the Country Airplay chart completely, making it the first song in that chart's history to fall off the chart from number one.

Music video
The music video was directed by Shane Drake and premiered in February 2016.

Charts

Weekly charts

Year end charts

Certifications

References

2015 songs
2015 singles
Justin Moore songs
Big Machine Records singles
Songs written by Rodney Clawson
Songs written by Natalie Hemby
Music videos directed by Shane Drake
Songs written by Matt Dragstrem
Song recordings produced by Jeremy Stover